Madeinox–BRIC–AR Canelas was a Portuguese professional cycling team based in Canelas. It was one of the European teams in UCI Continental Tour.

Bruno Neves took the teams first non-national championship win when he won Stage 9 of the Volta a Portugal. In 2007 at the GP CTT Correios de Portugal the team won two stages and the overall. Stage one was won by André Vital Moreira who won the 173km stage in a reduced bunch sprint. Stage 3 was the second stage of the race where Nuño Duarte Silva Marta won another reduced bunch sprint this time with the bonus seconds he took the lead and held it through to the end of the race.

Team roster
On January 1 2006

Major wins
Sources:
2005
  Portuguese Under-23 Road Race, Hélder Oliveira
 Stage 9 Volta a Portugal, Bruno Neves
2006
 Troféu RDP-Algarve, Bruno Neves
  Points classification Troféu Joaquim Agostinho, Cláudio Faria
2007
  Overall Vuelta a Extremadura, Nuno Marta
Stage 1, André Vital Moreira
Stage 3, Nuno Marta
 Stage 3 GP CTT Correios de Portugal, André Vital Moreira

References

Cycling teams based in Portugal
UCI Continental Teams (Europe)
Cycling teams established in 2005
Cycling teams disestablished in 2006
Defunct cycling teams based in Portugal